is a Japanese anime television network owned by  AT-X, Inc. was founded on June 26, 2000 as a subsidiary of TV Tokyo Medianet, which is (in turn) owned by TV Tokyo. Its headquarters are in Minato, Tokyo. AT-X network has been broadcasting anime via satellite, cable, and IPTV since December 24, 1997.

AT-X broadcasts many Comic Gum anime adaptations. Ikki Tousen, Ah My Buddha and Juden Chan were shown on this channel first, before they were rebroadcast on Tokyo MX. As a premium channel, AT-X is also known for showing uncensored versions of several anime like Juden Chan, Ah My Buddha, Girls Bravo, Elfen Lied,  Mahoromatic, High School DxD and Redo of Healer, which would normally get censored on free-to-air television because of the large amounts of mature content.

History 
 December 24, 1997 - AT-X begins broadcasting on DirecTV Channel 270.
 November 30, 1998 - Bandai Chara Net TV (owned by Bandai, which AT-X aired through) closes due to SkyPort, its satellite provider (a subsidiary of Mitsubishi owned Space Communications Corporation, also jointly held by Sony Corporation), shutting down. AT-X moves to the "SuperBird C" satellite.
 1999 - Starts airing "Diamond Time", their first self-produced show.
 June 26, 2000 - AT-X Inc. is founded.
 September 30, 2000 - DirecTV ceases Japanese operations, focusing on its core American market instead (its former parent, Hughes Electronics (a General Motors subsidiary), launched their own subscription satellite service of the same name in the United States in 1994).
 October 1, 2000 - AT-X is picked up by Sky PerfecTV! on Channel 729.
 May, 2001 - Figure 17, the first AT-X funded anime, begins airing.
 July 1, 2002 - Sky! PerfecTV 2 begins broadcasting AT-X on Channel 333.
 January 26, 2004 - Launch of "AT-X Shop", their online store.
 July 12, 2005 - Mobile edition of the shop launches.
 April 1, 2009 - Subscription price raises to 1890 yen. 24-hour broadcast schedule starts.
 June, 2009 - TV Tokyo's Keisuke Iwata is appointed president of the company.
 October 1, 2009 - SKY PerfectTV! HD begins broadcasting AT-X HD on Channel 667.
 November 1, 2009 - Hikari TV begins broadcasting AT-X HD on Channel 380.
 January 27, 2010 - Sky PerfecTV! e2 switches from 4:3 to 16:9 aspect ratio while retaining Standard Definition.
 October 1, 2011 - J:COM begins broadcasting AT-X HD on Channel 605.
 October 1, 2012 - The AT-X broadcast configuration is dramatically reorganized.
 December, 2012 - AT-X joins the Association of Copyright for Computer Software (ACCS), in an effort to keep their videos off the Internet.
 February 28, 2013 - Ceased all SD broadcasts, for a full transition to HD broadcasting.
 April 18, 2013 - AT-X airs its first foreign cartoon/non-anime series in Japanese language; My Little Pony: Friendship Is Magic
 November 29, 2013 - Closure of the "AT-X Shop" online store.
 December 24, 2017 - AT-X celebrates 20th anniversary with the new anime programming lineup for 2018.

TV programs

See also
 Television in Japan
 Nickelodeon
 Cartoon Network
 Disney Channel
 Kids Station

References

External links
   
 

1997 establishments in Japan
Japanese-language television stations
Television stations in Japan
Mass media companies established in 2000
Television channels and stations established in 1997
Television networks in Japan
Anime television
Television in Tokyo
TX Network